This is a list of the provinces of South Africa by Human Development Index as of 2021.

Historical data

References

South Africa
Human Development Index
South African provinces by Human Development Index
Human Development Index
Society of South Africa
Human Development Index